John Eliot ( – 21 May 1690) was a Puritan missionary to the American Indians who some called "the apostle to the Indians" and the founder of Roxbury Latin School in the Massachusetts Bay Colony in 1645. In 1660 he completed the enormous task of translating the Eliot Indian Bible into the Massachusett Indian language, producing more than two thousand completed copies.

English education and Massachusetts ministry

John Eliot was born in Widford, Hertfordshire, England and lived at Nazeing as a boy.
He attended Jesus College, Cambridge. After college, he became assistant to Thomas Hooker at a private school in Little Baddow, Essex. After Hooker was forced to flee to the Netherlands, Eliot emigrated to Boston, Massachusetts, arranging passage as chaplain on the ship Lyon and arriving on 3 November 1631. Eliot became minister and "teaching elder" at the First Church in Roxbury.

From 1637 to 1638 Eliot participated in both the civil and church trials of Anne Hutchinson during the Antinomian Controversy. Eliot disapproved of Hutchinson's views and actions, and was one of the two ministers representing Roxbury in the proceedings which led to her excommunication and exile. In 1645, Eliot founded the Roxbury Latin School. He and fellow ministers Thomas Weld (also of Roxbury), Thomas Mayhew of Martha's Vineyard, and Richard Mather of Dorchester, are credited with editing the Bay Psalm Book, the first book published in the British North American colonies (1640). From 1649 to 1674, Samuel Danforth assisted Eliot in his Roxbury ministry.

Roxbury and Dorchester, Massachusetts 
There are many connections between the towns of Roxbury and Dorchester and John Eliot.  After working for a short time as pastor in Boston as the temporary replacement for John Wilson at Boston's first church society, John Eliot settled in Roxbury with other Puritans from Essex, England. He was the teacher at The First Church in Roxbury for sixty years and was their sole pastor for forty years.

For the first forty years in Roxbury, Eliot preached in the 20-foot by 30-foot meetinghouse with thatched roof and plastered walls that stood on Meetinghouse Hill.  Eliot founded the Roxbury Grammar School and he worked hard to keep it prosperous and relevant. Eliot also preached at times in the Dorchester church, he was given land by Dorchester for use in his missionary efforts. And in 1649 he gave half of a donation he received from a man in London to the schoolmaster of Dorchester.

Use of the Massachusett language 

The chief barrier to preaching to the American Indians was language. Gestures and pidgin English were used for trade but could not be used to convey a sermon. John Eliot began to study the Massachusett or Wampanoag language, which was the language of the local Indians. To help him with this task, Eliot relied on a young Indian named "Cockenoe". Cockenoe had been captured in the Pequot War of 1637 and became a servant of an Englishman named Richard Collicott. John Eliot said, "he was the first that I made use of to teach me words, and to be my interpreter." Cockenoe could not write but he could speak Massachusett and English.  With his help, Eliot was able to translate the Ten Commandments, the Lord's Prayer  and other scriptures and prayers.

In 1660 Eliot had also translated the Bible from English to the Massachusett Indian language, and had it printed by Marmaduke Johnson and Samuel Green on the press in Cambridge, Massachusetts.  By 1663, Marmaduke and Green had printed 1,180 volumes of the Old and New Testaments translated from English to the Massachusett Indian language.

The first time Eliot attempted to preach to Indians (led by Cutshamekin) in 1646 at Dorchester Mills, he failed and said that they, "gave no heed unto it, but were weary and despised what I said." The second time he preached to the Indians was at the wigwam of Waban near Watertown Mill which was later called Nonantum, now Newton, MA. John Eliot was not the first Puritan missionary to try to convert the Indians to Christianity but he was the first to produce printed publications for the Algonquian Indians in their own language.

This was important because the settlements of "praying Indians" could be provided with other preachers and teachers to continue the work John Eliot started.  By translating sermons to the Massachusett language, John Eliot brought the Indians an understanding of Christianity but also an understanding of written language. They did not have an equivalent written "alphabet" of their own and relied mainly on spoken language and pictorial language.

Missionary career

An important part of Eliot's ministry focused on the conversion of Massachusett and other Algonquian Indians. Accordingly, Eliot translated the Bible into the Massachusett language and published it in 1663 as Mamusse Wunneetupanatamwe Up-Biblum God. It was the first complete Bible printed in the Western hemisphere; Samuel Green and Marmaduke Johnson printed 1,000 copies on the first printing press in the American colonies.

In 1666, Eliot published "The Indian Grammar Begun", again concerning the Massachusett language. As a missionary, Eliot strove to consolidate the Algonquian Indians in planned towns, thereby encouraging them to recreate a Christian society. At one point, there were 14 towns of so-called "Praying Indians", the best documented being at Natick, Massachusetts. Other praying Indian towns included: Littleton (Nashoba), Lowell (Wamesit, initially incorporated as part of Chelmsford), Grafton (Hassanamessit), Marlborough (Okommakamesit), a portion of Hopkinton that is now in the Town of Ashland (Makunkokoag), Canton (Punkapoag), and Mendon-Uxbridge (Wacentug).

In 1662, Eliot witnessed the signing of the deed for Mendon with Nipmuck Indians for "Squinshepauk Plantation". Eliot's better intentions can be seen in his involvement in the legal case, The Town of Dedham v. The Indians of Natick, which concerned a boundary dispute. Besides answering Dedham's complaint point by point, Eliot stated that the colony's purpose was to benefit the Algonquian people.

Praying Indian towns were also established by other missionaries, including the Presbyterian Samson Occom, himself of Mohegan descent. All praying Indian towns suffered disruption during King Philip's War (1675), and for the most part lost their special status as Indian self-governing communities in the course of the 18th and 19th centuries, in some cases being paid to move to Wisconsin and other areas further West.

Eliot also wrote The Christian Commonwealth: or, The Civil Policy Of The Rising Kingdom of Jesus Christ, considered the first book on politics written by an American, as well as the first book to be banned by a North American governmental unit. Written in the late 1640s, and published in England in 1659, it proposed a new model of civil government based on the system Eliot instituted among the converted Indians, which was based in turn on the government Moses instituted among the Israelites in the wilderness (Exodus 18).

Eliot asserted that "Christ is the only right Heir of the Crown of England," and called for an elected theocracy in England and throughout the world. The accession to the throne of Charles II of England made the book an embarrassment to the Massachusetts colony. In 1661 the General Court forced Eliot to issue a public retraction and apology, banned the book and ordered all copies destroyed.

In 1709 a special edition of the Massachusett Bible was co-authored by Experience Mayhew and Thomas Prince with the Indian words in one column and the English words in the opposite column. The 1709 Massachusett Bible text book is also referred to as the Massachusett Psalter. This 1709 edition is based on the Geneva Bible, like the Eliot Indian Bible.

Family

John Eliot married Hanna Mumford in September 1632, the first entry in the "Marages of the Inhabitants of Roxbury" record. They had six children, five sons and one daughter. Their daughter Hannah Eliot married Habbakuk Glover . Their son, John Eliot, Jr., was the first pastor of the First Church of Christ in Newton, Another son, Joseph Eliot, became a pastor in Guilford, Connecticut, and later fathered Jared Eliot, a noted agricultural writer and pastor. John Eliot's sister, Mary Eliot, married Edward Payson, founder of the Payson family in America, and great-great-grandfather of the Rev. Edward Payson. He was also an ancestor of Lewis E. Stanton a United States attorney for the District of Connecticut. He is related to the Bacon family.

Death
Eliot died in 1690, aged 85, his last words being "welcome joy!" His descendants became one branch of a Boston Brahmin family.

Legacy

Natick remembers him with a monument on the grounds of the Bacon Free Library. The John Eliot Elementary School in Needham, Massachusetts, founded in 1956, is named after him. Puritan "remembrancer" Cotton Mather called his missionary career the epitome of the ideals of New England Puritanism. William Carey considered Eliot alongside the Apostle Paul and David Brainerd (1718–1747) as "canonized heroes" and "enkindlers" in his groundbreaking An Enquiry Into the Obligation of Christians to Use Means for the Conversion of the Heathen (1792).

In 1689, he donated  of land to support the Eliot School in what was then Roxbury's Jamaica Plain district and now is a historic Boston neighborhood. Two other Puritans had donated land on which to build the school in 1676, but boarding students especially required support. Eliot's donation required the school (renamed in his honor) to accept both Black and Native American students without prejudice, which was very unusual at the time. The school continues near its original location today, with continued admissions of all ethnicities, but now includes lifelong learning.

The town of Eliot, Maine which was in Massachusetts during its incorporation was named after John Eliot.

Eliot appears in the alternate history 1632 Series anthology collection 1637: The Coast of Chaos. His wife is killed shortly after the birth of their first child by French soldiers invading the Thirteen Colonies. A group of time travelers bring a book about the world they come from that allows Eliot to read about how much of his works were undone by his fellow colonists, he then sets out to alter his missionary efforts in a manner that will prevent Native American converts from being vulnerable to the treachery they faced in the old timeline.

Works
trans., The Book of Genesis, 1655.
trans., The Psalter, 1658.
The Christian Commonwealth: or The Civil Policy Of The Rising Kingdom of Jesus Christ, 1659 Librivox audio
A Christian Covenanting Confession, 1660.
trans., Wusku Wuttestamentum Nullordumun Jesus Christ (New Testament), 1661.
trans., Mamvsse Wunneetupanatamwe Up-Biblum God (The Holy Bible containing the Old Testament and the New), 1663, rev. ed. 1685.
The Indian Grammar Begun, 1666.
Brief Narrative of the Progress of the Gospel amongst the Indians in New England, in the Year, 1670
The Logic Primer, 1672.
The Harmony of the Gospels in the holy History of the Humiliation and Sufferings of Jesus Christ, from his Incarnation to his Death and Burial, 1678.
Nehtuhpeh peisses ut mayut, A Primer on the Language of the Algonquian Indians, 1684.

See also
John Eliot Square District

References

Bibliography
Carpenter, John. "New England Puritans: The Grandparents of Modern Protestant Missions." Fides et Historia 30, no. 4, (October 2002).
Cesarini, J. Patrick. "John Eliot's 'A Brief History of the Mashepog Indians,' 1666." The William and Mary Quarterly 65, no. 1 (2008): 101–134.
Cogley, Richard. John Eliot’s Mission to the Indians before King Philip’s War. Cambridge, MA: Harvard University Press, 1999.
Dippold, Steffi. "The Wampanoag Word: John Eliot’s Indian Grammar, the Vernacular Rebellion, and the Elegancies of Native Speech." Early American Literature 48, no. 3 (2013): 543–75.
 
 
Francis, John Eliot, the Apostle to the Indians, in "Library of American Biography," volume 5 (Boston, 1836).
 
Winsor, Memorial History of Boston, volume 1 (Boston, 1880–81).
Walker, Ten New England Leaders (New York, 1901).
 
The Eliot Tracts: with letters from John Eliot to Thomas Thorowgood and Richard Baxter (London, 2003).
"Massachusetts Town Vitals Collection 1620-1988" record for Habbacuke Glover.

Further reading
  

 

 

 

 

 

 

  (Covers Eliot's involvement in producing the Indian Bible in great detail)

External links

Cambridge University - John Eliot Biography
Cambridge University - John Eliot Exhibition 
Eliot School
The New Testament of Our Lord and Saviour Jesus Christ / Wusku Wuttestamentum Nul-Lordumun Jesus Christ Nuppoquohwussuaeneumun (Cambridge: 1661) digitized by the John Carter Brown Library
Manitowompae pomantamoonk sampwshanau Christianoh uttoh woh an pomantog wnssikkitteahonat God (Cambridge: 1665) digitized by the John Carter Brown Library
The Indian grammar begun (Cambridge: 1666) digitized by the John Carter Brown Library
 

1600s births
1690 deaths
17th-century Christian clergy
Alumni of Jesus College, Cambridge
American Congregationalist ministers
American lexicographers
Kingdom of England emigrants to Massachusetts Bay Colony
American political writers
American male non-fiction writers
American religious writers
American evangelicals
Founders of schools in the United States
Congregationalist missionaries in the United States
Congregationalist writers
Creators of writing systems
People of colonial Massachusetts
Massachusetts colonial-era clergy
17th-century New England Puritan ministers
People from Widford, Hertfordshire
Translators of the Bible into indigenous languages of the Americas
English Congregationalist missionaries
Burials in Boston
17th-century philanthropists
17th-century translators
Missionary linguists